Cambraster is an extinct genus of edrioasteroids with species that existed during the Cambrian.

See also 
 List of prehistoric echinoderm genera
 List of edrioasteroids

References

External links 

 
 

Cambrian echinoderms
Edrioasteroidea
Prehistoric Crinozoa genera
Fossil taxa described in 1923